The 1947 Epsom by-election was a parliamentary by-election held in the United Kingdom on 4 December 1947 to fill the vacant House of Commons seat of Epsom in Surrey. The vacancy arose when the sitting Member of Parliament (MP), Sir Archibald Southby resigned from the House of Commons by accepting the Stewardship of the Chiltern Hundreds.

Results

References 

 

Epsom by-election 
Epsom by-election 
Epsom and Ewell
Epsom, 1947
20th century in Surrey
Epsom by-election